Anders Blixt (born in 1959) is a Swedish game designer and science journalist. He is one of the most well-published designers of role playing games in Sweden and has had a leading role in the production of most of them, including classical titles such as Drakar och Demoner and Mutant.

Selected works

Äventyrsspel
 Drakar och Demoner Expert
 Drakar och Demoner Gigant
 Monsterboken
 Monsterboken 2
 Torshem
 Mutant 2
 Efter Ragnarök

Rävspel
 Gondica
 Gondica Bestiarium
 Gondica Abyssos
 Lemuria
 Spiran och staven (fantasy novel)
 The Ice  War  (science fiction novel in English)

Lancelot Games
 Encyclopedia Digoni
 Wastelands
 Wastelands Sverige

Modiphius
Mutant Year Zero

Iron Crown Enterprises
 Gorgoroth
 The Kin-strife
 Southern Gondor
 Cyber Europe

101 Productions
 Viking
 Norden
 Västerled
 Jarl Eriks Arv

Saga Games
 Röd Sand
 Knivblänk i Prag
 Roma Umbrarum

Västerås bishopric
 Ansgar

Försvarets internationella centrum (SWEDINT)
 Kashmir's Forgotten Guardians

References

External links
LIBRIS record for Anders Blixt
 Alvione, a web museum of Swedish role-playing games from 1982 till today.

1959 births
Role-playing game designers
Swedish journalists
Lund University alumni
Living people
Interlingua speakers